"I've Been Around Enough to Know" is a song written by Bob McDill and Dickey Lee.  It was first recorded in 1975 by Jo-El Sonnier for Mercury Records. Sonnier's version, his debut single, peaked at number 78 on the Hot Country Songs charts. Sonnier's version was produced by Glenn Keener. In 1978, Conway Twitty released Conway which included "I've Been Around Enough to Know". It was later recorded by actor American country music artist John Schneider. It was released in July 1984 as the first single from the album Too Good to Stop Now.  The song was Schneider's fourth country hit and the first of four number ones on the country chart.

Chart performance

Jo-El Sonnier

John Schneider

Year-end charts

References

1975 debut singles
1984 singles
Conway Twitty songs
Jo-El Sonnier songs
John Schneider (screen actor) songs
Songs written by Dickey Lee
Songs written by Bob McDill
Song recordings produced by Jimmy Bowen
Mercury Records singles
MCA Records singles
1975 songs